Temporary Sanity is the eighth studio album by American country music singer Eddy Raven. It was released in 1989 by Universal Records.

Content and reception
The album accounted for two number one singles on Hot Country Songs: "In a Letter to You" (a cover of Shakin' Stevens) and "Bayou Boys". Following these singles were "Sooner or Later" and "Island". The latter two were issued via Capitol Records, which acquired Universal in 1989.

Raven said of the album's sound that he wanted to add influences of Latin and Caribbean music to his sound, noting in particular the inclusion of steel drums on "Bayou Boys", and comparing "Zydeco Lady" to the sound of Miami Sound Machine. Jason Ankeny of Allmusic called the album a "mixed bag", referring to "Island" as a "moody ballad" but calling the sound of "Bayou Boys" "hamfisted".

Track listing

Personnel
Adapted from liner notes.

Musicians
Eddie Bayers - drums
Barry Beckett - keyboards
Michael Black - background vocals
Larry Byrom - acoustic guitar
Paul Franklin - lap steel guitar
Mitch Humphries - keyboards, synthesizers
Mike Lawler - synthesizers
Frank J. Myers - acoustic guitar
Michael Rhodes - bass guitar
Dennis Wilson - background vocals
Curtis Young - background vocals
Reggie Young - electric guitar
Technical
Barry Beckett - producer
Milan Bogdan - mastering
Robb Earls - mixing assistant
Scott Hendricks - recording, mixing
John Hurley - recording assistant
John Kunz - recording assistant
Simon Levy - art direction
Glenn Meadows - mastering
Peter Nash - photography
Willie Pevear - recording
Tom Singers - recording assistant

Chart performance

References

1989 albums
Eddy Raven albums
Albums produced by Barry Beckett
Universal Records (1988) albums
Capitol Records Nashville albums